Elections in Gujarat are being conducted since 1962 to elect the members of the Gujarat Vidhan Sabha and the members of the lower house of the Indian Parliament, the Lok Sabha. There are 182 Vidhan Sabha constituencies and 26 Lok Sabha constituencies in the state.

Major Political Parties 
The Bharatiya Janata Party (BJP), the Indian National Congress (INC) and the Aam Admi Party are currently represented in the state legislature. Other parties which have been influential in the past include Swatantra Party, Praja Socialist Party (PSP), Indian National Congress (Organisation) (NCO), Janata Party, Janata Dal, Janata Dal (Gujarat) (JDG) and Rashtriya Janata Party (RJP).

Lok Sabha elections 
Gujarat was a part of the erstwhile Bombay State till 1960.

Vidhan Sabha elections
Elections for the Gujarat Legislative Assembly (Vidhan Sabha) have been held since 1962.

References

External links
 Gujarat Legislative Assembly, Official website